The Department of Canadian Heritage, or simply Canadian Heritage, is the department of the Government of Canada that has roles and responsibilities related to initiatives that promote and support "Canadian identity and values, cultural development, and heritage."

The department is administered by the Deputy Minister, currently Hélène Laurendeau, who is appointed by the Governor in Council, and it reports directly to the Minister of Canadian Heritage, who is currently Pablo Rodríguez.

Under its current mandate, the jurisdiction of Canadian Heritage encompasses, but is not limited to, jurisdiction over: the promotion of human rights, fundamental freedoms and related values; multiculturalism; the arts; cultural heritage and industries, including performing arts, visual and audio-visual arts, publishing, sound recording, film, video, and literature; national battlefields; the encouragement, promotion, and development of sport; the advancement of official bilingualism; state ceremonial and Canadian symbols; broadcasting, except in regards to spectrum management and the technical aspects of broadcasting; the development of cultural policy, including such policy as it relates to foreign investment and copyright; the conservation, exportation and importation of cultural property; the organization, sponsorship, and promotion of public activities and events, in the National Capital Region, that will "enrich the cultural and social fabric of Canada;" and national museums, archives and libraries.

To fulfill these tasks, the department coordinates a portfolio of several agencies and corporations that operate in a similar area of interest. While the roles and responsibilities of Canadian Heritage have remained relatively constant over the years, the department and composition of its portfolio remain in flux due to continuing structural changes.

History 
Founded on 25 June 1993, the Department of Canadian Heritage was initially created by Kim Campbell from parts of several other federal departments, combining responsibility for official languages, arts and culture, broadcasting, parks, and historic sites, as well as programs in the areas of multiculturalism, citizenship, state ceremonial, amateur sport and the National Capital Commission. In 1994, the Department of Canadian Heritage inherited Parks Canada from Environment Canada, as well as activities that formerly belonged to the Departments of Communications, of Multiculturalism and Citizenship, and of Fitness and Amateur Sport, and the Secretary of State. Since then, Canadian Heritage has gone through several structural and portfolio changes.

In 2003, Canadian Heritage added the Public Service Staff Relations Board (PSRB) to its portfolio, while Parks Canada was returned to the jurisdiction of Environment Canada. Eleven years later, in 2014, the PSRB was removed from the portfolio upon the enactment of the Public Service Labour Relations and Employment Board Act, which established the PSRB as a quasi-judicial tribunal that operates at arm's length from the government.

In late 2008, the multiculturalism section of Canadian Heritage was transferred to the Department of Citizenship and Immigration, then transferred back again in November, 2015.

In 2018, the Status of Women secretariat moved out from the umbrella of Canadian Heritage to become its own department.

In 2020, Canadian Heritage introduced established the Federal Anti-Racism Secretariat as part of its national Anti-Racism Strategy.

Department 

The Department of Canadian Heritage is headquartered in the Jules Léger Building (South) in Terrasses de la Chaudière, Gatineau, Quebec, across the Ottawa River from the Canadian capital of Ottawa.

The department is an umbrella organization that has one of the largest portfolios in the Canadian federal government, and the organizations in the portfolio support the department in the pursuit of its priorities while also striving to achieve their individual mandates.

The departmental framework (as of 2019–20) is:

 Creativity, arts and culture
 Arts
 Cultural marketplace framework
 Cultural industries support and development
 Heritage and celebration
 National celebrations, commemorations and symbols
 Community engagement and heritage
 Preservation of and access to heritage
 Learning about Canadian history
 Sport
 Sport development and high performance
 Diversity and inclusion
 Multiculturalism
 Human rights
 Indigenous languages and cultures
 Youth engagement
 Official languages

In addition to coordinating with the organizations in its portfolio, the department also partners with provincial and territorial governments to organize and oversee visits from the King of Canada and other members of the royal family.

Structure 
Canadian Heritage is administered by the Deputy Minister, currently Hélène Laurendeau, who is appointed by the Governor in Council. The Deputy Minister is accompanied by an Associate Deputy Minister (currently Isabelle Mondou) and a Deputy Minister of Diversity and Inclusion and Youth and Senior Associate Deputy Minister (currently Gina Wilson).

Activities at the department are overseen by several senior officials, and reports directly to the Minister of Canadian Heritage, who is currently Steven Guilbeault. Activities related to official languages report to the Minister of Economic Development and Official Languages, currently held by Mélanie Joly; and diversity, inclusion and youth activities report to the Minister of Diversity, Inclusion and Youth, who is currently Bardish Chagger. 

The department is divided into five different areas that each have their own Assistant Deputy Minister:

 Sport, Major Events, Commemorations and Portfolio Affairs — administered by the Assistant Deputy Minister, Joëlle Montminy
 Community and Identity — administered by Assistant Deputy Minister, Charles Slowey
 Cultural Affairs — lead by Senior Assistant Deputy Minister, Jean-Stéphane Piché
 Strategic policy, Planning and Corporate Affairs — administered by Assistant Deputy Minister, David Dendooven
Official Languages, Heritage and Regions — administered by Assistant Deputy Minister, Julie Boyer

Portfolio

Organizations 
All organizations of the Canadian Heritage portfolio report to Parliament through the same Minister. , the portfolio consists of:

 2 special operating agencies:
 the Canadian Conservation Institute
 the Canadian Heritage Information Network
 2 administrative tribunals:
 Canadian Cultural Property Export Review Board
 Canadian Radio-television and Telecommunications Commission (CRTC)
 3 departmental agencies:
 Library and Archives Canada (LAC)
 National Battlefields Commission
 National Film Board of Canada. (NFBC)
 12 Crown corporations:
 Canada Council for the Arts
 Canada Science and Technology Museum
 Canadian Broadcasting Corporation
 Canadian Museum for Human Rights
 Canadian Museum of History
 Canadian Museum of Immigration at Pier 21
 Canadian Museum of Nature
 Canadian Race Relations Foundation
 National Arts Centre
 National Gallery of Canada
 Telefilm Canada

Legislation 
The following statutes are administered, in whole or in part, by the portfolio of Canadian Heritage:

 Department of Canadian Heritage Act
 An Act to Incorporate the Jules et Paul-Emile Léger Foundation
 Broadcasting Act
 Canada Council for the Arts Act
 Canada Travelling Exhibitions Indemnification Act
 Canadian Charter of Rights and Freedoms
 Canadian Multiculturalism Act
 Canadian Radio-television and Telecommunications Commission Act
 Copyright Act (cultural policy)
 Cultural Property Export and Import Act
 Fitness and Amateur Sport Act
 Foreign Publishers Advertising Services Act
 Holidays Act
 Income Tax Act (tax credits, national arts, service organizations, and cultural property)
Indigenous Languages Act (royal assent: 21 June 2019)
 Investment Canada Act (cultural foreign investment)
 Laurier House Act (for certain powers)
 Lieutenant-Governors Superannuation Act (in part)
 Library and Archives of Canada Act
 Museums Act
 National Anthem Act
 National Arts Centre Act
 National Battlefields at Quebec Act
 National Film Act
 National Horse of Canada Act
 National Sports of Canada Act
 National Symbol of Canada Act
 Official Languages Act (Part VII)
 Parliamentary Employment and Staff Relations Act
 Physical Activity and Sport Act (in respect of sport)
 Public Servants Disclosure Protection Act
 Public Service Employment Act (report to Parliament)
 Public Service Labour Relations Act
 Salaries Act (Lieutenant-Governors)
 Sir John A. Macdonald Day and the Sir Wilfrid Laurier Day Act
 Status of the Artist Act (Part I)
 Telefilm Canada Act
 Trade-marks Act (use of national symbols)

Programs and budget 
In 2020, the department had a budget of CA$3.89 billion—this is an increase from the $3.66 billion of the previous year, but a minimal decrease from the $3.9 billion budget of 2018.

In the 2019‒20 fiscal year, the total actual spending of Canadian Heritage amounted to $1.55 billion and its total actual full-time equivalents were 1,843.3.

Expenses 
Through its Multiculturalism Programs, in 2019‒20, Canadian Heritage allocated more than $30 million of funding for 116 projects, 372 events, 56 "Community Support for Black Canadian Youth" initiatives, a "National Anti-Black Racism Education and Awareness" campaign, and 77 "Community Capacity Building" initiatives.

In 2019‒20, through its Creative Export Strategy (which is in its 2nd year), Canadian Heritage invested almost $7.2 million in 23 "export-ready projects" to support creative entrepreneurs in maximizing their export in the global marketplace. Launched in 2019–20 was the "Local Journalism Initiative" with an investment of $50 million over five years, supporting the creation of original civic journalism that covers the multidimensional needs of underserved communities across the country. Partnering with TV5Monde public broadcasters, the Canadian government supported the creation of a French-language digital platform with an investment of $14.6 million over five years, beginning in 2019–20.

In 2019–20, the Celebration and Commemoration Program funded 207 National Indigenous Peoples Day events across Canada, and provided $1.3 million in funding to the Aboriginal Peoples Television Network (APTN) to organize and host the 2019 APTN Indigenous Day Live in Calgary, AB, Whitehorse, YT, and Winnipeg, MB. (APTN is headquartered in Winnipeg.)

In June 2019, the Department's Legacy Fund supported the centennial anniversary of the Winnipeg general strike, funding a major monument across from Winnipeg's City Hall in the shape of a tipped streetcar, a reference to 21 June 1919, or 'Bloody Saturday'.

Grants and financial support 
Canadian Heritage gives out roughly $1.2 billion in grants annually, available for programs that contribute to the objectives of the department. These departmental objectives include those that relate to supporting culture, history, heritage, sport and Canada's official languages.

In 2019, it was reported that Canadian Heritage provided over $130,000 in public grant money to organizations with ties to the Chinese Communist Party's United Front Work Department, which published ads critical of the 2019–20 Hong Kong protests.

The department  requires that application forms be submitted by the deadlines that are specified under the application guidelines of the particular funding program in order to be considered for financial support. A confirmation notice is sent by the department within two weeks of getting an application, and a decision on whether funding will be granted or not is made within thirteen to thirty weeks, depending on the funding program. The first payment is made on or before the fourth week after the Department of Canadian Heritage has sent out a written notice that an application has been approved.

Programs 
In February 2020, the joint Human Rights Program submitted a report to the United Nations, Canada's Interim Report under the Convention against Torture and Other Cruel, Inhuman or Degrading Treatment or Punishment, coordinating input between the federal government and provincial and territorial governments.

Also in 2020, Canadian Heritage introduced the national Anti-Racism Strategy, which includes the Anti-Racism Action Program, several new measures, and funding for hundreds of projects to "foster diversity and inclusion across the country." The department established the Federal Anti-Racism Secretariat as part of this strategy. Canadian Heritage was additionally given a new mandate to host and support the activities of two secretariats: the LGBTQ2 Secretariat, which promotes the societal contributions of LGBTQ2 communities and "ensures that [their] rights are protected;" and the Youth Secretariat, whose activities include "coordinating meetings of the Prime Minister’s Youth Council and recruiting the next cohort of young people for the Council."

In 2019, among the various celebrations supported by Canadian Heritage was the 50th anniversary of the decriminalization of homosexuality in Canada. Also that year, Sport Canada supported the development of the "Universal Code of Conduct to Prevent and Address Maltreatment in Sport." While the 2020 Olympic and Paralympic Games in Tokyo were postponed (due to the COVID-19 pandemic), Canadian Heritage remained committed to Canadian athletes, high-performance athletes in particular.

References

External links

 
Federal departments and agencies of Canada
Canada
Ministries established in 1993
1993 establishments in Canada